Actinodoria is a genus of tachinid flies in the family Tachinidae. The only known tachinid parasitoid of a dragonfly is believed to belong to this genus, and was discovered as a larva living near the dragonfly's wing muscles.

Species
Actinodoria argentata Reinhard, 1975
Actinodoria argentea Thompson, 1964
Actinodoria argentifrons (Wulp, 1890)
Actinodoria cuprea Townsend, 1927

References

Exoristinae
Diptera of North America
Tachinidae genera
Taxa named by Charles Henry Tyler Townsend